Fogo de Palha is a 1926 Brazilian drama film directed by Canuto Mendes de Almeida based on a story by Plínio de Castro Ferraz

The film premiered in Rio de Janeiro on 6 December 1926.

Cast

Vicente Bifano as Assunção 
Fernando Cardoso   
Rosa de Maio as Eulália 
Diógenes de Nioac as João Brito 
Múcio de Sèvres as Radamés 
Georgette Ferret as Helena  
Joaquim Garnier as  Polidoro Soares 
J. Quental   
Lulu Melo Ramos   
Odette Redondo

External links
 

1926 drama films
1926 films
Brazilian black-and-white films
Brazilian silent films
Brazilian drama films
Silent drama films